Cuatrecasanthus is a genus of South American flowering plants in the sunflower family.

 Species
 Cuatrecasanthus flexipappus (Gleason) H.Rob. - Ecuador, Peru
 Cuatrecasanthus jelskii (Hieron.) H.Rob. - Peru
 Cuatrecasanthus sandemanii (H.Rob.) H.Rob. - Peru

References

Asteraceae genera
Vernonieae
Taxonomy articles created by Polbot